The Ligier JS47 is an open-wheel formula race car, designed, developed and produced by French manufacturer Ligier, specifically built to Formula 3 regulations, in 2004.

References 

Open wheel racing cars
Formula Three cars
Ligier racing cars